Mason Science College was a university college in Birmingham, England, and a predecessor college of Birmingham University. Founded in 1875 by industrialist and philanthropist Sir Josiah Mason, the college was incorporated into the University of Birmingham in 1900. Two students of the college, Neville Chamberlain and Stanley Baldwin, later went on to become Prime Ministers of the UK.

History

The college was established by an English industrialist and philanthropist Sir Josiah Mason in 1875. The building of the college in Edmund Street, Birmingham was designed by Jethro Cossins and opened on 1 October 1880 and was marked by a speech by Thomas Henry Huxley. In the speech, Huxley considered the opening of the college as a victory for scientific cause and supported Mason's antagonistic views on the classics and theology. The college developed various liberal and vocational subjects, but forced out the artisans. The medical and scientific departments of Queen's College, Birmingham moved to the nearby Mason Science College.

In 1898, it became Mason University College, with Joseph Chamberlain becoming the President of Court of Governors of the college. In 1900 it was incorporated into the University of Birmingham. Students at the College were awarded their degrees by the University of London until the University of Birmingham was established and received degree awarding powers in its own right.

William A. Tilden was professor of chemistry from 1880 to 1894. In September 1893, Francis William Aston began his university studies at the college, where he was taught physics by John Henry Poynting and chemistry by Frankland and Tilden.

In 1881, Charles Lapworth became the first professor of geology at the college. In 1891, physics professor John Henry Poynting successfully calculated the mean density of the Earth.

The Mason College building housed Birmingham University's Faculties of Arts and Law for over half a century after the founding of the University in 1900. The Faculty of Arts building on the Edgbaston campus was not constructed until 1959–61. The Faculties of Arts and Law then moved to the Edgbaston Campus.

After the Second World War, the style of architecture was not as appreciated as it is now. Paul Cadbury referred to it in 1952 as a neo-gothic monstrosity and expected it to be demolished within 50 years. In the event, it was demolished in 1964, along with the original Central Public Library and the Birmingham and Midland Institute, as part of the redevelopment within the inner ring road. The former Central Library stood on the site of the old college, the library having moved to a new site in 2013; the building was demolished in 2016.

Departments
During the first academic session of the college in 1880 courses in physics, chemistry, biology and mathematics were offered to students. By 1881 courses in geology and mineralogy, botany and vegetable physiology, engineering, English language and literature, Greek and Latin, and French and German language and literature were also available. From 1882 Medical students at Queen's College, Birmingham were able to attend classes in botany, physiology and chemistry, and in 1892 the medical faculty of Queen's College was transferred to Mason College. There was also a short-lived department of ‘Mental and Moral Science’, which was not successful despite funds being gifted specifically to support the endeavor in 1882.

Academics and alumni

Notable academics and alumni of the college include:

 Edward Arber, academic and writer
 Francis William Aston, chemist and physicist, 1922 Nobel Prize in Chemistry
 Stanley Baldwin, British Prime Minister
 Sir Gilbert Barling, 1st Baronet, physician
 John Belling, cytogeneticist who developed the iron-acetocarmine staining technique which is used in the study of chromosomes 
 Sir Nathan Bodington, Professor of classics
 Adrian John Brown, FRS, pioneer in the study of enzyme kinetics
 Arthur Henry Reginald Buller, British-Canadian mycologist mainly known as a researcher of fungi and wheat rust
 Neville Chamberlain, British Prime Minister
 Lawrence Crawford (mathematician) FRSE (1867–1951), taught in the college
 Sir Guy Dain, Chairman of the British Medical Association 1943–49 (M.B. medicine)
 Hermann Georg Fiedler, German scholar
 Sir Henry Fowler, locomotive engineer
 Percy F. Frankland, chemist
 Ernest Gold, set up the first operational (military) meteorological service, Deputy Director of the Meteorological Office
 John Berry Haycraft, discovered an anticoagulant created by the leech, which he named hirudin
 John Rippiner Heath, physician and composer
 Micaiah John Muller Hill, FRS, English mathematician, known for Hill's spherical vortex and Hill's tetrahedra
 Charles William Hobley, pioneering colonial administrator in Kenya
 Frank Horton, Professor of Physics at Royal Holloway College and Vice-Chancellor of the University of London 1939–45
 Henry Eliot Howard, ornithologist
 Arthur Lapworth, FRS, chemist
 Charles Lapworth, FRS, FGS, geologist who pioneered faunal analysis using index fossils and identified the Ordovician period
 Robert Thomson Leiper, parasitologist and helminthologist
 Lionel Simeon Marks, engineer and one of the pioneers of aeronautics
 Gerald Rusgrove Mills, publisher who established the publishing company Mills & Boon
 John Henry Muirhead, philosopher
 Constance Naden, poet and philosopher
 Charles Talbut Onions, English grammarian and lexicographer and the fourth editor of the Oxford English Dictionary
 Kineton Parkes, novelist and art historian
 Sir Leonard Parsons, Professor of Paediatrics, dean of Birmingham medical school, in 1932 the first to use synthetic vitamin C to treat scurvy in children
 Sir Robert Howson Pickard, chemist who did pioneering work in stereochemistry and was Vice Chancellor of the University of London from 1937–1939
 John Henry Poynting, physicist
 Dame Ethel Shakespear, geologist, public servant and philanthropist
 Edward Adolf Sonnenschein,  Classical Scholar and writer on Latin grammar and verse
 F. J. M. Stratton, Professor of Astrophysics at the University of Cambridge
 Sir William A. Tilden, chemist
 Swale Vincent,  physiologist
 William Whitehead Watts, FRS, geologist
 Wilmer Cave Wright, philologist and historian of science and medicine
 John Howard Whitehouse, Liberal Member of Parliament
 Sir Bertram Windle, physician

References

Sources
Ordnance Survey 1st Edition Map, 1890
 Ulrls.lon.ac.uk
  Ulrls.lon.ac.uk
 Ulrls.lon.ac.uk
 Ulrls.lon.ac.uk
 Ulrls.lon.ac.uk
 Ulrls.lon.ac.uk
 Archive.org
 Ulrls.lon.ac.uk

External links
 Lists of students at Mason Science College
 1960s photograph

University of Birmingham
Demolished buildings and structures in the West Midlands (county)
Science and technology in the West Midlands (county)
Educational institutions established in 1875
1875 establishments in England
Buildings and structures demolished in 1964